is a professional Japanese baseball player. He plays outfielder for the Yokohama DeNA BayStars.

External links

 NPB.com

1984 births
Living people
Baseball people from Miyazaki Prefecture
Japanese baseball players
Nippon Professional Baseball outfielders
Yokohama BayStars players
Yokohama DeNA BayStars players
Japanese baseball coaches
Nippon Professional Baseball coaches